DENIS J1048−3956 is an exceptionally small, dim ultra-cool red dwarf star about 13.2 light years from Earth in the southern constellation of Antlia, among the closest stars to Earth. This star is very dim with an apparent magnitude of about 17, and will require a telescope with a camera to be seen. It was discovered in 2000 by Xavier Delfosse (Institute of Astrophysics of the Canary Islands, now Observatoire de Grenoble) and Thierry Forveille (Canada–France–Hawaii Telescope Corporation), with the assistance of nine other astronomers.

Kinematically, DENIS J1048−3956 belongs to the young thin disc. In 2005 a powerful flare from this object was detected by radio astronomy.

J1048 is a good example of the smallest, least massive stars possible. With a mass of just 7.5% that of the Sun’s, it is barely large enough to sustain fusion in its core. In fact, it is so small, dim and cool that it was originally thought to be a brown dwarf.

See also
 List of nearest stars

References

External links
 Image DEN 1048-3956
 The nearest stars: DEN 1048-3956
 M dwarfs, L dwarfs and T dwarfs
 Parallax Investigation Results
 Infrared Photometry from 2Mass and Denis
 Image 2MASS J10481463-3956062

Local Bubble
Antlia
DENIS objects
J10481463−3956062
M-type main-sequence stars